I Want a Little Girl is an album by saxophonist/vocalist Eddie "Cleanhead" Vinson which was recorded and released by the Pablo label in 1978.

Reception

The AllMusic review by Scott Yanow stated "Eddie "Cleanhead" Vinson, 64 at the time of this Pablo recording, is in superior form on the blues-oriented material. ... this is a particularly strong release. ... he still infuses these versions with enthusiasm and spirit, making this set a good example of Cleanhead's talents in his later years".

Track listing
 "I Want a Little Girl" (Billy Moll, Murray Mencher) – 5:30
 "Somebody's Gotta Go" (Big Bill Broonzy) – 4:44
 "Blues in the Closet" (Oscar Pettiford) – 5:12
 "No Good for Me" (Eddie Vinson, Joe Medwick) – 4:39
 "Stormy Monday" (T-Bone Walker) – 10:50
 "Straight, No Chaser" (Thelonious Monk) – 5:42
 "Worried Mind Blues" (Art Hillery) – 3:04

Personnel
Eddie "Cleanhead" Vinson – alto saxophone, vocals
Martin Banks – trumpet
Rashid Jamal Ali – tenor saxophone
Art Hillery – piano, organ
Cal Green – guitar
John Heard – bass
Roy McCurdy – drums

References

Pablo Records albums
Eddie Vinson albums
1981 albums
Albums produced by Norman Granz